Alto Taquari is the southernmost municipality in the Brazilian state of Mato Grosso.

References

Municipalities in Mato Grosso
Populated places established in 1986
1986 establishments in Brazil